Borneogena siniaevi is a moth of the family Tortricidae. It is found in Vietnam.
The wingspan is 22 mm. The ground colour of the forewings is brownish cream densely suffused and sprinkled with brown. The strigulae (fine streaking) along the costa is brownish and the markings are brown, diffuse and ill-defined, except for the costal area. The hindwings are cream tinged brownish.

Etymology
The species is named after its collector, V. Siniaev.

References

Moths described in 2009
Archipini
Moths of Asia
Taxa named by Józef Razowski